Wilfrid "Zog" Zogbaum (1915 – January 7, 1965) was an American painter, sculptor, and educator. He was also a commercial photographer in the late 1940s, and started a sculpture studio in Montauk.

Life
Wilfrid Zogbaum was born in 1915 in Newport, Rhode Island. Zogbaum's father was Admiral Rufus F. Zogbaum, Jr., and his grandfather was painter Rufus Fairchild Zogbaum.

He studied art at the Rhode Island School of Design for two summers. Followed by study at Yale School of Fine Arts (now Yale School of Art), under John Sloan, and Hans Hoffman. Giorgio Cavallon and George McNeil were the class aids in Hoffman's class. In 1937, Zogbaum was awarded a Guggenheim Fellowship to studied in Europe. While in Europe he met Ben Nicholson, Naum Gabo and László Moholy-Nagy, Fernand Léger and Wassily Kandinsky.

He served as a photographer in the U.S. Army Signal Corps during World War II. He was an Associate Professor at University of California, Berkeley (U.C. Berkeley) in 1957 and 1961–1962.

Zogbaum's work has been exhibited in a number of galleries, including the Anita Shapolsky Gallery in New York City, Manny Silverman Gallery in Los Angeles, and Michael Rosenfeld Gallery in New York City. His papers are held at the Archives of American Art.

References

External links
http://www.aaa.si.edu/collections/interviews/oral-history-interview-wilfrid-zogbaum-11800

1915 births
1965 deaths
St. George's School (Rhode Island) alumni
Artists from Newport, Rhode Island
People from Montauk, New York
20th-century American sculptors
American male sculptors
United States Army personnel of World War II
20th-century American male artists
Rhode Island School of Design alumni
Yale School of Art alumni
University of California, Berkeley faculty